Harada Naojirō (12 October 1863 – 26 December 1899) was a Japanese painter who specialized in the yōga (Western) style.  He was a friend of the novelist Mori Ōgai and served as the model for the protagonist in Ōgai's short story  (1890).

Life and career

Early life
Harada Naojirō was born in the Koishikawa area of Edo (modern Tokyo) on 12 October 1863. Ichidō worked for the military government at the Bansho Shirabesho, where foreign books were studied and translated. That August he married Ōkubo Sada. From the age of eleven Harada began studying yōga, or Western-style painting under Yamazaki Nariaki, and from 20 under Takahashi Yuichi, who at the time was the most prominent yōga painter in Japan.

Study in Europe
Harada moved to Germany in 1884, where he audited classes at the Academy of Fine Arts. In Munich, he apprenticed under the Austrian painter Gabriel von Max, a friend of his brother . While in Munich he befriended the German painter Julius Exter and the Japanese writer Mori Ōgai, who had been dispatched to Germany by the Ministry of War of Japan.  In 1886, he began to live with a woman named Marie who worked in a café on the ground floor of the building he lodged in.  Around that October he guided Viscount Hamao Arata around, who was on a government tour of inspection abroad.  On 22 November, he left a pregnant Marie and toured Switzerland, Venice, and Rome, meeting Japanese painters there, and audited classes at the École des Beaux-Arts in Paris.  He left France in May the next year.

Later life
Returning to Japan in 1887, Harada opened a private school for western-style painting in his own home. He became ill around 1893 and died in 1899 at the age of 36.

Works

Notes

References

Yōga painters
Artists from Tokyo
1863 births
1899 deaths